Curvie emesia, the curve-winged metalmark, is a species of metalmark in the butterfly family Riodinidae. It is found in North America.

Subspecies
These two subspecies belong to the species Emesis emesia:
 Emesis emesia emesia
 Emesis emesia yucatanensis Godman & Salvin, 1886

References

Riodininae
Articles created by Qbugbot
Butterflies described in 1867